Fanny Lecluyse (born 11 March 1992) is a Belgian former swimmer. At the 2012 Summer Olympics, she competed in the women's 200 metre breaststroke, finishing in 19th place overall in the heats, failing to qualify for the semifinals. Belgium's Olympic Committee said that Lecluyse "was sent home before the end of the games after an incident of inappropriate behavior."

References

Belgian female breaststroke swimmers
1992 births
Living people
Olympic swimmers of Belgium
Swimmers at the 2012 Summer Olympics
Swimmers at the 2016 Summer Olympics
Sportspeople from Kortrijk
Swimmers at the 2020 Summer Olympics
21st-century Belgian women